Roy Emerson defeated Fred Stolle 6–4, 12–10, 4–6, 6–3 in the final to win the gentlemen's singles tennis title at the 1964 Wimbledon Championships. Chuck McKinley was the defending champion, but lost in the semifinals to Stolle.

Seeds

  Roy Emerson (champion)
  Chuck McKinley (semifinals)
  Manuel Santana (fourth round)
  Rafael Osuna (quarterfinals)
  Dennis Ralston (first round)
  Fred Stolle (final)
  Nicola Pietrangeli (second round)
  Martin Mulligan (second round)

Draw

Finals

Top half

Section 1

Section 2

Section 3

Section 4

Bottom half

Section 5

Section 6

Section 7

Section 8

References

External links

Men's Singles
Wimbledon Championship by year – Men's singles